Spencer Lee Howard (born July 28, 1996) is an American professional baseball pitcher for the Texas Rangers of Major League Baseball (MLB). He previously played in MLB for the Philadelphia Phillies.

Howard was born in San Luis Obispo and raised in Templeton, California. A multi-sport athlete at Templeton High School, he considered quitting the baseball team to focus on volleyball, but was persuaded to stay by the coach. He received no scholarship offers to play college baseball, but made the Cal Poly Mustangs baseball team after a fall tryout. Howard was a redshirt during his freshman year, taking the season to build his strength and pitch velocity. He further improved his pitching during two seasons of collegiate summer baseball with the Bellingham Bells of the West Coast League, and by his junior year in 2017, Howard served as a starting pitcher for the Mustangs.

The Phillies selected Howard in the second round of the 2017 MLB Draft, and he spent the season with the Class A Short-Season Williamsport Crosscutters, working on his pitching mechanics. In 2018, he was assigned to the Class A Lakewood BlueClaws, with whom he pitched the first postseason no-hitter in franchise history. Howard missed two months of the 2018 season due to a shoulder injury, and played in the Arizona Fall League to make up for the time he missed. After working his way up to Double-A in 2019, Howard was one of several Phillies prospects who began the pandemic-shortened 2020 season at an alternate training site, preparing for a major-league call-up. He made his MLB debut that season, but a recurrence of the shoulder injury limited his output. Since his major league debut, Howard has struggled with maintaining his pitch velocity into the later innings of a game, and in 2021, he was paired with long reliever Ranger Suárez for his scheduled starts. Howard was part of a trading deadline deal in 2021 that sent him to the Rangers in exchange for Kyle Gibson and Ian Kennedy.

Howard has struggled in the major leagues with maintaining his pitch velocity long into games, an issue that has been traced back to his shoulder injury from 2018.

Early life 
Spencer Lee Howard was born on July 28, 1996, in San Luis Obispo, California. He grew up in nearby Templeton, California, and was a multi-sport athlete at Templeton High School, playing baseball, volleyball, soccer, and Ultimate Frisbee. Baseball was not Howard's athletic priority; he almost quit the team during his junior year in order to pursue volleyball, and he did not play on private travel teams like many other high school baseball players seeking to break into professional leagues. After being persuaded by his coach to remain on the baseball team, Howard helped take Templeton to the Los Padres League championship as a junior in 2014.

At Templeton, Howard served as both a pitcher and an outfielder. During his senior season, Howard posted a 7–3 win–loss record, with a 2.20 earned run average (ERA), and he struck out 87 batters in  innings pitched. As a hitter, he also maintained a .306 batting average. At the end of the year, he was named both the San Luis Obispo County Player of the Year and the Los Padres League Most Valuable Player.

College career
Having not received any scholarship offers to play college baseball, Howard chose to attend California Polytechnic State University (Cal Poly) and major in business. In August 2015, before arriving at Cal Poly, Howard contacted the Mustangs baseball program and said that he was interested in playing for them. Howard chose to redshirt his freshman year in order to put on more muscle mass.

The summer after his freshman year of college, Howard played collegiate summer baseball with the Bellingham Bells of the West Coast League. Under the supervision of pitching coach Jim Clem, he spent the summer diversifying his pitching repertoire with a new breaking ball and changeup. Playing as a redshirt freshman in 2016, Howard served as a relief pitcher for the Mustangs, where he posted a 3–1 record and a 2.95 ERA, striking out 39 batters in  innings. Howard also recorded one save. In his 21 season appearances, Howard averaged more than 9.5 strikeouts per nine innings pitched.

Howard returned to Bellingham for another season of summer baseball in 2016. Most of his work with Clem that summer was in building his strength, in the hopes that he would become a starting pitcher. After a member of the Cal Poly starting rotation suffered an injury, Howard was called to fill in as a starting pitcher for the 2017 season. Partway through his redshirt sophomore season, Fangraphs named Howard the top overall draft-eligible pitcher, as well as the top starter, in the Big West Conference. He went 8–1 that season in 17 games, 12 of which were starts, with a 2.05 ERA and 97 strikeouts in  innings. MLB.com ranked Howard the 99th-best prospect in his draft class, while Baseball America ranked him 137th.

Professional career

Draft and minor leagues (2017–2019)
The Philadelphia Phillies of Major League Baseball (MLB) selected Howard in the second round, 45th overall, of the 2017 MLB Draft. He was the third-highest draft pick in Cal Poly history, and the highest that year. Howard signed with the team that June for a $1.15 million signing bonus. Howard bypassed the Rookie League, being assigned to the Class A Short-Season Williamsport Crosscutters of the New York–Penn League. In his first season of professional baseball, Howard put up a 1–1 record with a 4.45 ERA and 40 strikeouts in  innings over nine starts. Williamsport pitching coach Hector Berrios spent the season improving Howard's pitching mechanics, making him and the rest of the rotation focus on the lower half of his body, a move which helped to stabilize Howard's velocity and preserve the health of his arm after each start.

Howard spent the entire 2018 season with the Class A Lakewood BlueClaws of the South Atlantic League, where he earned Pitcher of the Week honors twice. On June 30, Howard recorded a career-high 10 strikeouts in six shutout innings against the Hagerstown Suns. He told reporters that the game was "the first time all year that all my stuff has been synced up and I've been able to command all four of my pitches". Two starts later, Howard pitched his first complete game in a 4–1 win over the Asheville Tourists. He pitched 112 innings for the BlueClaws in 2018, posting a 3.78 ERA in 23 starts and striking out 147 batters. On September 7, 2018, Howard pitched the first postseason no-hitter in BlueClaws history, striking out nine batters in the semifinal championship series against the Kannapolis Cannon Ballers and advancing the BlueClaws to the South Atlantic League championships. For his no-hitter, Howard received a Minor League Baseball Yearly Award for Top Performance.

The following season, Howard was assigned to the Class A-Advanced Clearwater Threshers of the Florida State League. He achieved another career-high strikeout performance on April 23, recording 11 in a 1–0 win against the Florida Fire Frogs. He missed two months of the season with shoulder soreness, returning to Clearwater on July 9, 2019, for four shutout innings against the Palm Beach Cardinals. At the end of July, Howard was promoted to the Double-A Reading Fightin' Phils of the Eastern League. He went 3–1 for the season, posting a 2.03 ERA and striking out 94 batters in 71 innings with Clearwater, Reading, and a pair of rehab appearances with the GCL Phillies. At the end of the season, Howard was named a Phillies Organization All-Star. After the season, Howard was one of six Phillies prospects assigned to the Scottsdale Scorpions of the Arizona Fall League. He planned to use the league to build his pitching time and make up for the two months that were missed due to a shoulder injury, while working on some of his newer pitches. In six fall league starts, Howard posted a 1–1 record and a 2.11 ERA, striking out 27 batters in  innings of work.

Philadelphia Phillies (2020–2021)
On June 30, 2020, Minor League Baseball chose to cancel its 2020 season due to the COVID-19 pandemic. Several Phillies prospects, including Howard, began the pandemic-shortened season by practicing at an alternate training site in Allentown, Pennsylvania. The decision not to include Howard on the opening day roster was motivated both by a desire to see his pitching control and for contractual reasons; by waiting at least five days into the season to promote him to the major leagues, the Phillies maintained control of Howard's contract through the 2026 season. Howard made his major league debut on August 9, 2020, starting on the mound for the second game of a doubleheader against the Atlanta Braves. He struck out four batters in  innings, but allowed four runs on seven hits, including two home runs, and the Braves won the game 8–0. His first career win came on August 31, when he pitched five innings of an 8–6 victory over the Washington Nationals, striking out sluggers Trea Turner and Juan Soto in the process. Despite leaving a September 12 start with more shoulder pain, Howard was included on the Phillies' 40-man roster on September 20. Howard pitched only  innings in his rookie season, and posted a 5.92 ERA, allowing 30 hits and six home runs while striking out 23 batters.

Howard's limited performance in 2020 led to the offseason acquisitions of Matt Moore and Chase Anderson as back-of-the-rotation starters for the Phillies in 2021. Howard, meanwhile, was assigned to the Triple-A Lehigh Valley IronPigs at the start of the season in order to build his arm strength. Continued issues with Anderson's pitch control and inability to consistently record outs pushed the pitcher to the bullpen on May 21, with Howard called up to fill his place in the starting rotation. Howard struggled with stamina in his first two season starts, with his fastball velocity dropping over the course of the first few innings. Both times, Ranger Suárez was called to the mound to provide long relief, and manager Joe Girardi told reporters that he planned on utilizing the two pitchers together for the remainder of the season, with Suárez providing relief as Howard continued to build strength and experience. On June 29, after five starts of 68 or fewer pitches each, the Phillies optioned Howard to Lehigh Valley. He was called back up for a July 22 start against the New York Yankees after Zach Eflin suffered a knee injury and Bailey Falter was placed on COVID-19 protocols. He pitched three innings on short rest and maintained his velocity on both a fastball and slider throughout the appearance. After leaving the team, Howard referred to his time in Philadelphia as like "trying to polish a turd", contrasting the Phillies' immediate desire to win games with the more long-term pitching development that he had required at the time.

Texas Rangers (2021–present)
On July 30, 2021, the Phillies traded Howard, Kevin Gowdy, and Josh Gessner to the Texas Rangers in exchange for Kyle Gibson, Ian Kennedy, and Hans Crouse. The Rangers coaching staff hoped to transition Howard into a full-time major-league starting pitcher, in contrast to Philadelphia, where he had bounced between the major and minor leagues, as well as between the rotation and the bullpen. In his Texas debut, Howard lasted two no-hit innings before allowing three runs in the third inning. He was taken out of the game after allowing his fourth base runner, and the Rangers lost to the Los Angeles Angels 5–0. Howard's difficulties with consistency and pitch delivery in later innings, as well as a drop in velocity, followed him in Texas, and he finished his first full major league season with an 0–5 record and a 7.43 ERA in 19 games, striking out 52 batters in  innings.

Howard beat A. J. Alexy and Glenn Otto in spring training to become the Rangers' fifth starter for the 2022 season. He suffered a blister and cracked fingernail shortly into the season and was placed on the injured list on April 11.

Pitcher profile
Howard has carried a four-pitch repertoire throughout his professional career. His pitching is rooted in a fastball, with a changeup, slider, and curveball acting as off-speed pitches. In 2018, when one particular pitch was struggling to land during a game, Howard would retire it for the rest of the game and focus on the others; a goal that he set in 2019 was to maintain all four pitches throughout an outing.

There have been concerns about Howard's long-term health and ability to pitch deep into games. As a rookie in 2020, Howard lost  between spring training and the start of the pandemic-abbreviated season, and his irregular practice in the spring and summer led to a loss of strength and stamina. A recurring shoulder injury has also limited Howard's long-term effectiveness. During the 2020–21 offseason, Howard pursued physical therapy to prevent a recurrence of the injury, while making changes to his pitching mechanics, particularly in his hips, that were aimed to limit the damage.

References

External links

1996 births
Living people
Baseball players from California
Cal Poly Mustangs baseball players
Clearwater Threshers players
Florida Complex League Phillies players
Lakewood BlueClaws players
Lehigh Valley IronPigs players
Major League Baseball pitchers
People from San Luis Obispo, California
Philadelphia Phillies players
Reading Fightin Phils players
Round Rock Express players
Scottsdale Scorpions players
Texas Rangers players
United States national baseball team players
Williamsport Crosscutters players